This is a list of newspapers in Venezuela, both national and regional. It also includes newspapers with other languages and themes.

National

Regional

Anzoátegui state

Apure state

Aragua state

Barinas state

Bolívar state

Carabobo state

Cojedes state

Delta Amacuro state

Falcón state

Guárico state

Lara state

Mérida state

Miranda state

Monagas state

Nueva Esparta state

Portuguesa state

Sucre state

Táchira state

Trujillo state

Vargas state

Yaracuy state

Zulia state

Economic newspapers

Sports newspapers

Catholic or religion-themed

Ethnic minorities

Other languages

Weekly newspapers

Free daily newspapers

Defunct

Online

Daily Newsletters

See also
 List of television networks in Venezuela

Further reading

External links
 

Venezuela
Newspapers published in Venezuela
Newspapers